"Carnival" is a song by Dutch pop group Ch!pz. It’s reached number one on Netherlands Top 40 and 100.
“Carnival” is part of the special and Christmas edition for Germany.

Charts

Weekly charts

Year-end charts

References

2005 singles
Dutch Top 40 number-one singles
2005 songs
Ch!pz songs